Gnaphosa moesta is a ground spider species found in Hungary, Romania, Ukraine and Russia.

See also 
 List of Gnaphosidae species

References

External links 

Gnaphosidae
Spiders of Europe
Spiders of Russia
Spiders described in 1875